LaBrava, the 1983 novel by author Elmore Leonard, follows the story of Joe LaBrava, former Secret Service agent.  This novel won the 1984 Edgar Award for Best Novel.

Plot summary
Joe LaBrava gets involved with former movie star Jean Shaw, an actress whom he had admired when he was a twelve-year-old boy, before discovering that she is being harassed by thug Richard Nobles and his partner Cundo Rey.

Reception
According to Christopher Lehmann-Haupt of The New York Times, "What's unusual about LaBrava is that no matter how complicated its implications grow, it remains firmly rooted in its realistic milieu. And despite all the double-crossing mayhem it metes out, nobody gets hurt who doesn't deserve to. The only innocent victim is the dream of Florida as a golden sunset for the old and infirm to fade peacefully into."

Characters in LaBrava
Joe LaBrava – former Secret Service agent, photographer
Richard Nobles – rent-a-cop
Cundo Rey – Marielito partner of Richard Nobles
Jean Shaw – former movie star
Maurice Zola – friend of Joe LaBrava and Jean Shaw
Paco Boza – Man who travels around in a wheelchair he stole from Eastern Airlines
Franny Kaufman – Girl who sells beauty products. Has eye on Joe.

Location
The setting of LaBrava is South Beach, Florida. Maurice Zola wistfully recalls the heyday of the 1930s and 1940s, when the area had a cachet with movie stars. By the 1980s, the area had fallen into disrepair and drug activity was rife. Movies such as Scarface and T.V. series such as Miami Vice showed this seamy side of South Beach. It is in this era that LaBrava is set. Since the 1990s the area has become gentrified.

Cancelled movie
Dustin Hoffman was slated to appear in a movie adaption of LaBrava. It was cancelled due to a contract dispute.

References

External links
 LaBrava @ Elmore Leonard's Official website

1983 American novels
Novels by Elmore Leonard
American thriller novels
Edgar Award-winning works
Novels set in Florida
Novels about actors